Daniel Otto Christian Isaachsen (22 August 1806 – 9 December 1891) was a Norwegian businessperson and politician.

He was born in 1806 as the son of wealthy businessman Daniel Isaachsen and his second wife Hanne Susanne Nideros. He married a Laura Pedersen. He was the half-brother of Peder and Isaach Isaachsen.

He was elected to the Norwegian Parliament in 1839, representing the constituency of Christianssand. He worked as a businessman and consul there.

References

1806 births
1891 deaths
Norwegian businesspeople
Members of the Storting
Politicians from Kristiansand